Miaoshan may refer to:

 Miaoshan, a legendary Chinese princess who became the bodhisattva Guanyin
Miaoshan, Jinan, a town in Shandong, China
Miaoshan, Tancheng County, a town in Shandong, China
Miaoshan High-tech Industrial Park, Wuhan, Hubei, China